Vidisha railway station is a railway station in Vidisha district of Madhya Pradesh. Vidisha is a 'A' Category railway station of West Central Railway Zone of Indian Railways. It serves Vidisha city. Its code is BHS. The station consists of four platforms. Passenger, Express and Superfast trains halt here.

References

Railway stations in Vidisha district
Bhopal railway division